|}

The Championship Standard Open NH Flat Race is a listed National Hunt flat race in Britain. It is run at Ascot a distance of about 2 miles (1 mile 7 furlongs and 152 yards, or 3,156 metres). The race is scheduled to take place each year in December. Prior to 2011 it was run as a Grade 2 race.

Winners

See also
Horse racing in Great Britain
List of British National Hunt races

References
 Racing Post:

National Hunt races in Great Britain
Ascot Racecourse
National Hunt flat races